The 60th Ariel Awards ceremony, organized by the Mexican Academy of Film Arts and Sciences (AMACC) took place on June 5, 2018, at the Palacio de Bellas Artes in Mexico City. During the ceremony, AMACC presented the Ariel Award in 26 categories honoring films released in 2017. The ceremony was televised in Mexico by Canal 22.

Sueño en Otro Idioma received six awards out of its 16 nominations, including Best Picture. La Región Salvaje followed with five awards, including Best Director for Amat Escalante. Actress Queta Lavat and cinematographer Toni Kuhn received the Golden Ariel for their outstanding artistic careers.

Background
During a press conference held on April 23, 2018, actresses Ilse Salas and Tiaré Scanda announced the nominees for the 60th Ariel Awards. Sueño en Otro Idioma received the most nominations with 16, including Best Picture; by virtue of his position as President of the AMACC, its film director, Ernesto Contreras did not submit his name for consideration for Best Director. For the first time three female directors were listed for the Best Director accolade, Natalia Beristáin, Lucía Gajá, and Issa López. Gajá was also nominated for Best Picture, Best Documentary Feature, Best Film Editing (Batallas Íntimas) and Best Animated Short (Nos Faltan). Lopez also received a nomination for Best Original Screenplay for Vuelven. Karina Gidi and Daniel Giménez Cacho received nominations for Best Actress and Best Actor for playing adult versions of Rosario Castellanos and Ricardo Guerra Tejada, respectively, while Tessa Ia and Pedro de Tavira, were nominated for Best Supporting Actress and Best Supporting Actor, for the younger versions of the same roles, with Gidi winning the award.

Awards
The following list includes nominees and winners will be highlighted with boldface and a  symbol.

Ceremony information

Ceremony
Ernesto Contreras, announced that the award ceremony was to be held at the Palacio de Bellas Artes in Mexico City on July 5, 2018, and dedicated to film directors. The ceremony was broadcast by Canal 22, TV UNAM, and also at the Cineteca Nacional, where 400 film students were invited. He also mentioned that 144 films were submitted for consideration, including 41 feature films, 17 documentary features, 73 short films, and 13 Iberoamerican feature films. The Golden Ariel was awarded to Mexican actress Queta Lavat for her outstanding career, and to cinematographer Toni Kuhn for his influence on new filmmakers.

Films
Four nominated films for Best Picture had been awarded on several international film festivals. Sueño en Otro Idioma received the World Cinema Audience Award: Dramatic at the 2017 Sundance Film Festival. Amat Escalante won the Silver Lion at the 73rd Venice International Film Festival for La Región Salvaje. La Libertad del Diablo earned the accolades for Best Mexican Film, Best Documentary, and Best Cinematography at the Guadalajara International Film Festival in 2017. Julio Chavezmontes and Sebastián Hofmann won the World Cinema Dramatic Special Jury Award for Screenwriting for Tiempo Compartido at the Sundance Film Festival. Sofía Gómez Córdova, winner for Best Director for Los Años Azules, Ayúdame a Pasar la Noche, Audience Award winner, and Cerulia, that won for Best Animated Short Film at the Guadalajara Film Festival in 2017, also received Ariel Awards nominations in 2018. El Vigilante, won Best Mexican Film and Best Actor (Leonardo Alonso) at the Morelia International Film Festival in 2016. Issa López, nominated for the Ariel Award for Best Director for Vuelven, received the same award at the Diosas de Plata in 2018.

Multiple nominations and awards

The following films received multiple nominations:

Films that received multiple awards:

References

Ariel Awards ceremonies
2018 film awards
Ariel
June 2018 events in Mexico